The Randers–Aalborg line or the Randers–Aalborg railway is a  long standard gauge double track railway line in Jutland, Denmark which runs through the historical region of Himmerland between Randers and Aalborg. It constitutes a section of Den Østjyske Længdebane, the through railway line through the Jutland Peninsula from Padborg to Frederikshavn.

The railway opened in 1869. From 1940 to 1953, the original single track railway line was converted to double track. The line is owned and maintained by Rail Net Denmark and served with passenger trains operated by the Danish State Railways (DSB).

History 

The British civil engineering consortium Peto, Brassey and Betts was granted concession to build the Randers–Aalborg line on 18 March 1861. Work on the railway line started in October 1865, and was completed in the late summer of 1869. It was opened on 18 September 1869 in the presence of King Christian IX.

Operations on the line commenced the following day with three trains daily in each direction. The line was operated by the state-owned railway company De jysk-fyenske Jernbaner (the Funen and Jutland Railways), which merged with De sjællandske Statsbaner (the State Railways of Zealand) in 1885 to form one national railway company, De danske Statsbaner (the Danish State Railways).

During World War I traffic on the line became busy enough to be beyond the capacity of a single track. As a consequence, it was decided already in 1918 to expand the single track to a double track.

In 2003, the Aalborg Commuter Rail, a commuter rail service in and near Aalborg, started operating on the northernmost section of the railway line from Skørping to Aalborg. In 2017, operation of the regional rail services from Aalborg station to Skørping station were transferred from DSB to the local railway company Nordjyske Jernbaner.

Stations

References

Citations

Bibliography

Further reading

External links 

 Banedanmark – government agency responsible for maintenance and traffic control of most of the Danish railway network
 DSB – largest Danish train operating company
 Nordjyske Jernbaner – Danish railway company operating in North Jutland Region
 Danske Jernbaner – website with information on railway history in Denmark
 Nordjyllands Jernbaner – website with information on railway history in North Jutland

Railway lines in Denmark
Railway lines opened in 1869
1869 establishments in Denmark
Rail transport in the Central Denmark Region
Rail transport in the North Jutland Region